The 2014 National Rugby Championship (known as the Buildcorp National Rugby Championship for sponsorship reasons) was the inaugural season of Australia's National Rugby Championship, involving nine professional rugby union teams from around Australia. The competition kicked off on 21 August 2014. The final was held on 1 November 2014 and won by Brisbane City.

Teams and venues

The nine teams for the 2014 NRC season included four from New South Wales, two from Queensland, and one each from Australian Capital Territory, Victoria, and Western Australia:

Home match venues for the 2014 NRC season:

Experimental Law Variations
As part of the initial championship, the ARU was given approval by the IRB to conduct experimental law trials as part of the 2014 National Rugby Championship. Proposed law variations were first considered by a panel composed of the current Wallabies coach Ewen McKenzie, former Wallabies coach Bob Dwyer, former Wallaby Rod Kafer and former top referee Wayne Erikson. The variations were then put to the voting public, before returning to the panel.

The variations in place for the 2014 and 2015 seasons are listed below.

Regular season
The nine teams compete in a round-robin tournament for the regular season. Each team has four matches at home and four away, and one bye. The top four teams qualify for the title play-offs with semi-finals and finals.

Standings

Round-by-round

Competition rounds

Round 1

Round 2

Round 3

Round 4

Round 5

Round 6

Round 7

Round 8

Round 9

Title play-offs
The top four sides in the regular season advanced to the knock-out stage of semi-finals and final to decide the National Rugby Championship title.

Semi-finals

Final

Season attendances

Players
The leading scorers in 2014 over the regular season and play-offs combined were:

Leading try scorers 

Source: rugby.com.au

Leading point scorers

Source: rugby.com.au

See also

 Australian Rugby Championship (predecessor tournament)
 Super Rugby

Notes

Reference list

External links
 
 
ARU Board approves nine team National Rugby Championship to start in August 2014

Team webpages

2014 National Rugby Championship
2014 in Australian rugby union
2014 rugby union tournaments for clubs